Ellis W. Carter (1906–1964) was an American cinematographer.

Selected filmography

 Big Town After Dark (1947)
 Speed to Spare (1948)
 Disaster (1948)
 Mr. Reckless (1948)
 Waterfront at Midnight (1948)
 El Paso (1949)
 Special Agent (1949)
 Gunmen of Abilene (1950)
 Hills of Oklahoma (1950)
 The Old Frontier (1950)
 The Blonde Bandit (1950)
 Lonely Heart Bandits (1950)
 Havana Rose (1951)
 The Magic Carpet (1951)
 The Barefoot Mailman (1951)
 Sunny Side of the Street (1951)
 The Texas Rangers (1951)
 Indian Uprising (1952)
 Thief of Damascus (1952)
 Sound Off (1952)
 Outlaw Women (1952)
 California Conquest (1952)
 The Royal African Rifles (1953)
 Running Wild (1955)
 The Black Dakotas (1954)
 The River Changes (1956)
 Flight to Hong Kong (1956)
 A Day of Fury (1956)
 Damn Citizen (1958)
 Night of the Quarter Moon (1959)
 The Leech Woman (1960)
 Seven Ways from Sundown (1960)
 Sex Kittens Go to College (1960)
 The Purple Gang (1960)
 The Wizard of Baghdad (1961)
 Pirates of Tortuga (1961)
 The Second Time Around (1961)
 Showdown (1963)
 Hootenanny Hoot (1963)
 Kissin' Cousins (1964)

References

Bibliography
 James L. Neibaur. The Elvis Movies. Rowman & Littlefield, 2014.

External links

1906 births
1964 deaths
American cinematographers
People from Ashland, Oregon